KDMM (103.1 FM) is a radio station licensed to serve the community of Parker Strip, Arizona. Its coverage area includes the communities of Parker, Lake Havasu City and Parker Dam. The station is owned by Sanford and Terry Cohen, through licensee River Rat Radio, LLC, and airs a Hot Hits format.  The station is known locally as K-DAM and streams worldwide on its website www.bestdamradio.com and on the River Rat Radio app.

KDMM is a member of the Parker, Lake Havasu City and Needles, CA Chambers of Commerce and supports the Lake Havasu Marine Association and Lake Havasu Hospitality Association.

The station was assigned the KDMM call letters by the Federal Communications Commission on March 1, 2016.

References

External links
 Official Website
 

DMM
Radio stations established in 2016
2016 establishments in Arizona
Contemporary hit radio stations in the United States
La Paz County, Arizona